Yasmin is usually a feminine given name, sometimes also a surname. Variant forms and spellings include Yasemin, Yasmeen,  Yasmina,  Yasmine,  and Yassmin.

Etymology
Yasmin is the Persian name for the flowering plant jasmine, from which the English name Jasmine also derive.

Given name

Yasemin
 Yasemin Adar (born 1991), Turkish sport wrestler
 Yasemin Begüm Dalgalar (born 1988), Turkish basketballer
 Yasemin Bradley, Turkish female physician specialized as nutritionist and dietitian, also a television presenter and writer
 Yasemin Can (born 1996), Turkish long-distance runner of Kenyan origin
 Yasemin Çegerek (born 1977), Dutch politician from Turkish descent
 Yasemin Dalkılıç (born 1979), Turkish free diver
 Yasemin Ecem Anagöz (born 1998), Turkish recurve archer
 Yasemin Güler (born 1994), Turkish handball player
 Yasemin Horasan (born 1983), Turkish basketball player
 Yasemin Kimyacıoğlu, Turkish-American basketball player
 Yasemin Kozanoğlu (born 1978), Turkish actress and model
 Yasemin Mori (born 1982), Turkish singer
 Yasemin Smit (born 1984), Dutch water polo player
 Yasemin Şahin (born 1988), Turkish handball player
 Yasemin Şamdereli (born 1973), Turkish-German actress
 Yasemin Saylar (born 1990), Turkish basketball player
 Yasemin Ustalar, Turkish boxer

Middle name
 Özlem Yasemin Taşkın (born 1985), retired Turkish swimmer

Yasmeen
 Yasmeen Al Maimani
 Yasmeen Ghauri (born 1971), Canadian model
 Yasmeen Godder
 Yasmeen Hameed, Pakistani Urdu poet
 Yasmeen Hanoosh
 Yasmeen Ismail
 Yasmeen Khair
 Yasmeen Khan (actress)
 Yasmeen Khan (cricketer)
 Yasmeen Lari (born 1941), Pakistani architect
 Yasmeen Murshed
 Yasmeen Pir Mohammad Khan
 Yasmeen Rehman
 Yasmeen Sami Alamiri
 Yasmeen Sulieman, American singer
 Yasmeen Vella
 Yasmeen Williams

Yasmin
 Yasmin (musician), British DJ and singer-songwriter
 Yasmin Abbasey (born 1950), Pakistani judge
 Yasmin Abdulaziz (born 1980), Egyptian actress
 Yasmin Aga Khan (born 1949), American Pakistani philanthropist
 Yasmin Ahmad (1958–2009), Malaysian film director
 Yasmin Alibhai-Brown (born 1949), Ugandan-born British journalist and author
 Yasmin Bannerman (born 1972), English actress
 Yasmin Benoit (born 1996), English model and activist
 Yasmin Bevan, English headteacher
 Yasmin Brunet (born 1988), Brazilian model
 Yasmin Deliz (born 1987), American reggaetón singer-songwriter, model and actress 
 Yasmin Evans (born 1990), British TV and radio presenter
 Yasmin Finney, British actress and Internet personality
 Yasmin K. (born 1986), German pop singer
 Yasmin Kafai, German professor
 Yasmin Kwadwo (born 1990), German sprint athlete
 Yasmin Le Bon (born 1964), British fashion model
 Yasmin Lee, Brazilian transgendered pornographic film actress
 Yasmin Levy (born 1975), Israeli singer-songwriter of Sephardic music
 Yasmin Paige (born 1991), English actress
 Yasmin Qureshi (born 1963), British politician
 Yasmin Ratansi (born 1951), Canadian politician
 Yasmin Sardouk (born 2000), Lebanese footballer
 Yasmin Siraj (born 1996), American figure skater
 Yasmin Warsame (born 1976), Somali-Canadian model
 Yasmin Wijnaldum (born 1998), Dutch model
 Yasmin Yusoff, Malaysian singer

Yasmina
 Yasmina Azzizi-Kettab (born 1966), retired Algerian heptathlete
 Yasmina Khadra (born 1955), Algerian author
 Yasmina Reza (born 1959), French Iranian playwright, actress, novelist and screenwriter
 Yasmina Siadatan (born 1981), British businesswoman of British and Iranian descent
 Yasmina Zaytoun (born 2002), Lebanese beauty pageant titleholder

Yasmine
 Yasmine Allas (born 1967), Somali actress and writer
 Yasmine Belmadi (1976–2009), French actor of Algerian origin
 Yasmine Bleeth (born 1968), American actress
 Yasmine Eriksson (born 1989), Swedish politician 
 Yasmine Fouad, Egyptian politician
 Yasmine Galenorn, Romantic fiction writer
 Yasmine Hamdan (born 1976), Lebanese singer
 Yasmine Hanani (born 1980), American actress
 Yasmine Kassari (born 1970), Belgian-Moroccan film director
 Yasmine Lafitte (born 1973), Moroccan and French pornographic actress
 Yasmine Mahmoudieh, German architect
 Yasmine Naghdi, British ballet dancer
 Yasmine Oudni (born 1989), Algerian volleyball player
 Yasmine Pahlavi (born 1968), wife of Reza Pahlavi II, Crown Prince of Iran
 Yasmine Posio (born 1974), Swedish politician
 Yasmine Ryan (ca. 1983–2017) New Zealand journalist
 Yasmine Zaki Shahab (born 1946), Indonesian anthropologist

Yassmin
 Yassmin Abdel-Magied, Australian activist
 Yassmin Alers, American stage actor

Fictional characters
 Yasmin Green, Family Affairs character played by Ebony Thomas from 1998 until 2005
 Yasmin, a Bratz doll
Yasmin Khan, a companion of the Thirteenth Doctor in the BBC series Doctor Who
 Yasamin Madrani, a main character in the animated web-series gen:LOCK
 Yasmina Ait Omar, a recurring character in the Belgian series wtFOCK

Surname
 Samina Yasmeen, Pakistani professor
 Sabina Yasmin (born 1953), Bangladeshi singer
 Farida Yasmin, Bangladeshi journalist
 Farida Yasmin, Bangladeshi singer
 Nilufar Yasmin, Bangladeshi singer

References

Arabic feminine given names
English feminine given names
Given names derived from plants or flowers
Hebrew feminine given names
Persian feminine given names
Pakistani feminine given names
Turkish feminine given names